Trichosirius inornatus is a species of medium-sized sea snail, a marine gastropod mollusc in the family Capulidae, the cap snails.

References

 Hutton, F. W. (1873). Catalogue of the marine Mollusca of New Zealand with diagnoses of the species. Didsbury, Wellington. xx + 116 pp
 Sowerby, G. B. II. (1874). Monograph of the genus Trichotropis. Conchologia iconica or, illustrations of the shells of molluscous animals. 19. Reeve, London.
 Finlay, H. J. (1928). The Recent Mollusca of the Chatham Islands. Transactions of the New Zealand Institute. 59: 232-286.
 Powell A. W. B., William Collins Publishers Ltd, Auckland 1979 
 Spencer, H.G., Marshall, B.A. & Willan, R.C. (2009). Checklist of New Zealand living Mollusca. pp 196–219. in: Gordon, D.P. (ed.) New Zealand inventory of biodiversity. Volume one. Kingdom Animalia: Radiata, Lophotrochozoa, Deuterostomia. Canterbury University Press, Christchurch

Capulidae
Gastropods of New Zealand
Gastropods described in 1873